Eftichia Papagianopoulou, also spelled as Eftihia Papagianopoulou (1893 – 7 January 1972), was a Greek lyricist. 

She was born in Aydın near Smyrna (now İzmir) in Asia Minor in 1893. She left Smyrna in 1919 prior to the Greco-Turkish War. She emigrated to Greece and settled permanently in Athens. 

She wrote the lyrics to many popular Greek songs, co-operating with composers like Vassilis Tsitsanis, Apostolos Kaldaras and Manos Hadjidakis; however, she never became very famous among the public until her 1972 death. Her great contribution to Greek music through her exceptional ability in writing lyrics wasn't broadly known and recognized, although many of the successful songs of the 1950s and 1960s had been composed by her.

A recent (2002) book written by lyricist and journalist Lefteris Papadopoulos, who was a friend of Eftichia during the last years of her life, helped a lot to increase recognition for her work.

Compositions
Many well-known songs have lyrics by Eftichia Papagianopoulos, including:
 Ta kavourakia (The little crabs), music: Vassilis Tsitsanis
 Dio portes echi i zoi (Life has two doors), music: Stelios Kazantzidis
 Ta alania (The gutter children), music: Vassilis Tsitsanis
 Ime aetos horis ftera (I am an eagle without wings), music: Manos Hadjidakis
 Pira ap ti nioti hromata (I took colours from youth), music: Apostolos Kaldaras
 Malamo, music: Stamatis Kraounakis
 Mi me paratas (Don't leave me), music: Apostolos Kaldaras
 An mou spasoun to bouzouki (If they break my bouzouki), music: George Zambetas

Books 
 Lefteris Papadopoulos(2002), Ola ine ena psema, Kastaniotis Editions; Athens

External links 
 Song-writing synopsis (in Greek)
 Song list & lyrics (Greek & translations)

1893 births
1972 deaths
Greek lyricists
Greek women songwriters
Emigrants from the Ottoman Empire to Greece
People from Aydın